José María Elorrieta (1921–1974) was a Spanish screenwriter and film director. He wrote or directed a number of Spaghetti Westerns.

Selected filmography

Director
 María Dolores (1953)
 Flame Over Vietnam (1957) 
 The Fan (1958)
 The Showgirl (1960)
 Today's Melodies (1960)
 The University Chorus (1960)
 Apache Fury (1964)
 Fuerte perdido (1965)
 The Treasure of Makuba (1967) - as Joe Lacy
 A Witch Without a Broom (1967) - as Joe Lacy
 The Vengeance of Pancho Villa (1967)
 The Emerald of Artatama (1969)

Screenwriter
 Devil's Roundup (1952)

References

Bibliography 
 Thomas Weisser. Spaghetti Westerns--the Good, the Bad and the Violent: A Comprehensive, Illustrated Filmography of 558 Eurowesterns and Their Personnel, 1961-1977. McFarland, 2005.

External links 
 

1921 births
1974 deaths
Spanish film directors
Spanish male screenwriters
People from Madrid
20th-century Spanish screenwriters
20th-century Spanish male writers